Speen may refer to:

Speen, Buckinghamshire, United Kingdom
Speen, Berkshire, United Kingdom
Speen railway station

See also